List of bus companies operating  - intercity bus services on the FlixBus network. Flixbus describes itself as "not owning any buses", contracting all services to small-to-medium or mittelstand bus companies, which it calls "bus partners".

Belarus 
 IP BayerTrans, Minsk

Belgium 
Cars Heyvaert & Spinnoy NV.
Coach Partners Brabant NV
Coach Partners West-Vlaanderen NV
Demerstee BVBA
Demuynck & Vansteelandt
FR Coach Partners West Vlaanderen, Kortijk
FR Demuynck & Vansteelandt, Bellegem
Jumbo Lines, Bury
UK Staf Cars, Lommel
De Vrij Travel, NV

Bosnia and Herzegovina 
Transturist d.d. Tuzla, Tuzla

Brazil 
Expresso Adamantina, Dracena
Santa Maria, São Bernardo do Campo
Primar, São José do Rio Preto
Satélite Norte, Goiânia
Levare, São José do Rio Preto

Bulgaria 
 Detelina Drita EOOD, Plovdiv

Croatia 
 Autoherc d.o.o.Metkovic
 Brioni d.d.
 Delminium Travel d.o.o.
 Hiems, Split
 Obrt za prijevoz putnika Velebit Tours, Gospić
 Prijevoznički obrt Antonio Tours, Vlašići
 Prijevoznički OBRT Josip Knežević, Plitvička Jezera
 Slavonija Bus, Velika Kopanica
 Vincek , Radovan Novi Marof

Czech Republic 
 Gumdrop , Praha
 Leo Express, Prague
 Trado Bus, Třebíč
 Umbrella Coach & Buses, Kunratice

Denmark 
Abildskou A/S, Aarhus
 DitoBus Excursions A/S
 Gislinge Turistfart, Fårevejle
 Hjallese Minibus , Odense
 Holstebro Turistbusser , Holstebro
 John's Turist-Og Minibus, Nykøbing Falster
 Kagans Turist, Greve
 Lyngby Turistfart , Rødovre
 Nyborg Rejser og Turistfart, Nyborg
 Papuga, Brørup
 Roskilde Turistfart og Rejsebureau, Karlslunde
 Rybussen, Ry
 Silkebus Silkeborg Busselskab, Silkeborg
 Sinding-Ørre Turist, Herning
 Skovlunde Busser, Glostrup
 Vejle Turisttrafik, Vejle
 Alssund Busser

Estonia 
 Lux Express

France 
 Actibus
 Arome
 Autocars Bardy
 Autocars Dominique - Be Green
 Autocars Menguy Burban
 Cars Denis
 Cars Saint Laurent
 Delgrange Voyages
 Fransejour, Saint Mars d'Outillé
 Free Dôme Evasion, Effiat
 Ginhoux, Aubenas
 ID Voyages, Wingles
 Launoy Tourisme, Rambervilliers
 Les Transports Andrieux, Ivry
 Location Car Paris, Paris
 Metz Evasion, Metz
 Privilège Transport, Saran
 SAS Autocars Faure Pays de Brive, Malemort sur Corrèze
 Socha (Royer Voyages), Behren Les Forbach
 The Travel Company Paris, Gonesse
 Touraine Excursions, Joué les Tours
 VIC Transport
 Voyages Cheze, Gimel les cascades

Germany 
 Albus München
 Anton Graf GmbH
 August Becker 
 Autobus Oberbayern
 Bader Reisen GmbH
 Bamberger Busreisen 3000 GmbH
 Bamberger Busreisen Krapp GmbH
 Baumann Fernbus GmbH
 BN Bus Betrieb Nieder GmbH
 Dirr-Reisen GmbH
 Freiburger Reisedienst, Freiburg i. Br.
 Fritz Wellhöfer-Omnibusunternehmen , Sachsen bei Ansbach
 Fuhrmann Fernbus , Rennau
 Gottlieb- Reisen, Bad Essen
 GradLiner Inh. Slavko Rezo, Isernhagen
 Grüner Omnibusse, Rudelzhausen
 Held Reisen, Oldendorf
 Höber-Reisen, Delbrück-Lippling
 Hörmann-Reisen , Augsburg
 Joost's Ostsee Express Busreisen, Rethwisch
 Klein-Wiele Reisen, Bocholt
 Kofahl-Reisen, Elmenhorst-Lichtenhagen
 Leibfritz, Sonnenbühl
 Lubina-Busfahrten, Stuttgart
 Mertens Reisen, Rietberg
 Moreau Touristik, Bexbach
 Neukam-Reba , Nürnberg
 Omnibusbetrieb Franz Käberich, Niederaula
 Pülm Reisen, Seesen/Rhüden
 Ramsbrock Busreisen Anja Ramsbrock, Mörfelden-Walldorf
 Reisebüro & Omnibusbetrieb Karsten Brust, Panketal
 Reisebüro & Omnibusse Weiherer, Rehau
 Rombs-Fernbus, Weißenburg
 Stuber, Zaberfeld
 Suerland Busreisen, Borchen-Etteln
 Sun World-Travel, Engelsbrand
 Thürauf, Bad Windsheim
 Udo Diehl Reisen, Wetter
 Urban Reisen, Bottrop
 Vestischer Reisedienst/Gutt Reisen, Haltern am See
 Wagner-tours, Sinsheim Hilsbach
 Weihrauch Uhlendorff, Northeim
 Werner Hummel Omnibusverkehr, Kirchzarten
 Eberhardt-Reisen Richard Eberhardt,  Engelsbrand
 BusArt Tours GmbH
 Busreisen Stephan Müller GmbH & Co. KG

Italy 
 Air Pullman
 ATVO s.p.a.
 Autolinee Crognaletti srl
 Autolinee Giuliano s.a.s.
 Autolinee Troiani S.r.l
 Autonoleggio Losio S.r.l.
 Autoservizi Guizzetti S.r.l.
 Autoservizi Michielotto snc
 Autoservizi Moriconi Massimo S.r.l.
 Autoservizi Perego
 Baltour S.r.l.
 Baranzelli Natur S.r.l.
 Barzi Service SRL
 Bellando Tours S.r.l.
 BMC Bus s.r.l.
 Bus Mobilità Srl
 Canalibus di Canali Cesarino & C.
 Caputo Bus
 Cialone Tour S.p.A.
 Della Penna autotrasporti S.r.l.
 Dibiasi Bus, Kurtatsch-Cortaccia
 Euro Booking, Salerno
 Euro Travel 2004, Roma
 Eurobus Montecosaro Scalo
 Florentia Bus, Cavriglia (AR)
 Fratelli Romano, Strongoli
 Garbellini , Rovigo
 Iannucci, Ceprano
 IAS Touring, Rossano
 Linea Azzurra, Moncalieri (Torino)
 Mirante Turismo, Napoli
 Monza Viaggi, Monza (MB)
 Morandi, Varese
 Perletti, Grumello del Monte
 Polidori , Montefiascone VT
 Reali Francesco, Porto San Giorgio
 Rigato Fratelli, Padova
 Rosà Autoservizi , Rosà (Vicenza)
 S.T.A.C. Società Trasporti Automobilistici Casalesi, Casale Monferrato (AL)
 SAC, Bra (CN)
 SAR Ranchio, Ranchio di Sarsina (FC)
 Sav Autolinee, Villafalletto (CN)
 Seatour, Roma
 Sellitto, Benevento
 SIT, Roma
 STAT, Casale Monferrato (AL)
 Stav Vigevano, Vigevano (PV)
 Sulga, Perugia
 Tundo Vincenzo, Zollino (LE)
 V.I.T.A., Arnad (AO)
 Volpi Licurgo, Genova
 Voulaz, Milano
 Europa Viaggi, Latina
 Pagliarini Bus, Civitanova Marche

Lithuania 
 Ollex, Vilnius

Netherlands 
 Lanting Reizen Travel, Hoogeveen
 Paulusma Reizen, BA Drachten
 SnelleVliet Touringcars, Alblasserdam
 Triomf Tours, Nieuwegein
 UK Nieuwland, Diemen
 Wijdemeren Tours, Ankeveen

 Norgesbuss Ekspress, Kolbotn
 Schaus Buss, Vestby

Poland 

 All-Mit Automobile Andrzej Fabisiak
 Beta-Bus s.c. Janusz Bulka Maciej Bulka
 Biuro Podróży Interglobus Tour sp. j. Andrzej i Tomasz Bloch
 BP Tour Sp. z o.o.
 Delta Transport sp. z o.o.
 E-BUS Emil Bonowicz
 GMF, Opole
 Grabor , Kobierzyce
 Inter , Strzelce Opolskie
 Jacek Legendziewicz Jordan Group, Kraków
 Mobilis, Warszawa
 Paweł Skowronek Usługi Przewozowo-Turystyczne Limes-Tour, Niepołomice
 Przedsiębiorstwo Komunikacji Samochodowej w Bydgoszczy, Bydgoszcz
 Przedsiębiorstwo Komunikacji Samochodowej w Szczecinku, Szczecinek
 Przedsiębiorstwo Transportowo Usługowe Oskar-Trans, Suchy Las
 SODO Visit Tur, Wrocław
 Souter Holdings Poland, Warszawa
 TPO Pastuszak, Kraków, Kraków
 Usługi Autokarowe Mariusz Romańczuk, Milicz
 Voyager Transport , Gorlice
 Zakład Usług Przewozowo-Turystycznych Limes, Niepołomice

Portugal 
 Ovnitur - Viagens e Turismo, Nogueira

Romania 
 Eurokings Travel , Ditrau
 Johann Travel, Sibiu
 Lazar Valfin Travel
 Panorama Turist, Gheorgheni
 Transcarlat, Slatina

Serbia 
 EUROPA BUS doo Valjevo, Valjevo
 Fudeks, Belgrade
 Sirmiumbus, Sremska Mitrovica

Slovakia 
 Turancar, Nitra

Slovenia 
 Babić-Bisstours, Prevozniško Podjetje, Trebnje

Spain 
 Badajoz Sevilla Bus, SL
 Car Tour S.A.
 Iberocoach International, Verin
 Minibuses López Rubio, Madrid
 UTE Madrid Lyon, Madrid

Sweden 

 AB Gimo Buss & Taxi
 AB Jörlanda Taxi & Buss
 Alternativ Trafik i Bjuv
 Aneby Buss AB
 Axelssons Turisttrafik AB
 BD Bussresor AB
 Bussbemanning I STHLM AB
 JBF Trafik, Habo
 Larsson-Resman Prod. i Värmland, Karlstad
 Mohlins Bussar, Ljusdal
 Molkom Buss, Molkom
 Y-Buss, Sundsvall

Turkey 
Kâmil Koç Otobüsleri A.Ş., Bursa

United Kingdom 
McGill's Bus Services, Greenock
Turners Coachways, Bristol
Whippet Coaches, Cambridge
Hearn's Coaches, Harrow 
Bella Road Services, Pontyclun 
Berrys Coaches, Taunton 
Parks of Hamilton, Plymouth 
Cymru Coaches, Swansea

United States 
 Amador Stage Lines, Sacramento CA
 Arrow Stage Lines, Omaha NE
 Classic Charter Inc, CA
 Deer USA, Monterey Park CA
       Eastern Bus, New York City
 Gray Line Arizona (Citizen Auto Stage Company), Nogales, AZ
 LD Tours, Las Vegas
 Louisiana Motor Coach, Marrero LA
 MTR Western, Seattle, WA
 Odyssey Bus, Orange, CA
 Pacific Coachways Charter Services, Garden Grove, CA
 Shuttle Solutions, Phoenix, AZ
 TourCoach Charter and Tours, Commerce, CA
 Transportation Charter Services (TCS), Orange, CA
 USA Coach Services, Las Vegas
 Wynne Transportation, Irving, TX

References

External links

Bus companies of Germany
Bus operating companies